Thomas Kogo  is an Anglican bishop in Kenya: he was Bishop of Eldoret from 1997 to 2010.

Notes

21st-century Anglican bishops of the Anglican Church of Kenya
Anglican bishops of Eldoret